Henry V the Fat ( – 22 February 1296) was a Duke of Jawor from 1273, of Legnica from 1278, and Duke of Wrocław from 1290.

He was the eldest son of Bolesław II the Bald, Duke of Legnica by his first wife, Hedwig, daughter of Henry I, Count of Anhalt.

Life

Early Years. Duke of Jawor, Battle of Stolec
As a youth, he was present at the court of King Ottokar II of Bohemia in Prague, where he became a knight.

In 1273, Henry's father gave him the town of Jawor (Jauer) as an independent duchy. Four years later, Henry's father Bolesław II the Bald, kidnapped his own nephew Henry IV, the ruler of the Duchy of Wrocław (Breslau), acting on behalf of his ally, king Rudolph of Habsburg. This act aroused the anger of the nobility in Lesser Poland and the neighbors of Henry IV, who then organized an expedition to free him and punish Bolesław. The Greater Poland-Głogów-Wrocław coalition was led by Dukes Przemysł II of Greater Poland and Henry III of Głogów. The armies fought at Ząbkowice Śląskie near Stolec, one of the bloodiest battles of the Polish Middle Ages. The coalition forces overwhelmed Bolesław's forces, and he fled the field, but then young Henry led a charge, turning the tide and achieving a great victory. Both Dukes Przemysł II and Henry III, of the coalition, were taken as prisoners. Young Duke Henry of Jauer, saved his family from disastrous defeat.

Death of Bolesław II the Bald. Henry V, Duke of Legnica
Henry succeeded his father Bolesław II as a Duke in Legnica on 26 December 1278. Shortly afterwards, Henry made his younger brothers Bolko I and Bernard co-rulers of Jawor and Lwówek. Henry retained the town of Środa Śląska, which Henry received in 1277 in exchange for Henry IV's freedom.

Henry continued the hostile relations with the other Piast Silesian Dukes that were characteristic of his father's rule. In 1281 he accepted the invitation of Henry IV Probus to a meeting in Sądowel. Henry IV imprisoned the Duke of Legnica with his former allies Henry III of Głogów and Przemysł II of Greater Poland, demanding political concessions from them. Henry regained his freedom, but had to recognize Henry IV as Duke of Wrocław (Breslau). Henry IV couldn't maintain his sovereignty. King Wenceslaus II of Bohemia, asserted his own claim on Wrocław (Breslau).

Henry V, Duke of Wrocław. War with Henry III of Głogów
On 23 June 1290 Henry IV Probus died suddenly, possibly poisoned. Henry IV named Henry III of Głogów his heir. The Wrocław nobility and townspeople opposed the appointment, fearing the Duke of Głogów would be a harsh ruler. Henry III fled, and the citizens of Wrocław (Breslau) invited Henry V to rule.

Henry III refused to step aside. War followed and the territories involved changed hands several times. On 11 November 1293, Henry was betrayed by Lutka Zdzieszyca, son of a Wrocław noble whom Henry had earlier sentenced to death. Lutka captured Henry and turned him over to Duke Henry III, who put him in prison for almost six months. Henry V obtained his freedom after surrendering the towns of Namysłów, Bierutów, Oleśnica, Kluczbork, Byczyna, Wołczyn, Olesno, Chojnów, and Bolesławiec and their respective fortresses to Henry III, paying a ransom of 30,000 pieces and promising to assist the Duke of Głogów in all his conflicts for the next five years.

During his imprisonment in Głogów, Henry's brother Bolko I was named regent of his lands. In 1291, Henry V gave Bolko I the towns of Świdnica (Schweidnitz), Ziębice, Ząbkowice Śląskie, and Strzelin in exchange for his help against Henry III.

Death and legacy
Henry was locked in an iron cage during his imprisonment, and was ill after his release. He never regained his health. Fearing for the future of his duchy, he sought the protection of the Holy See in 1294.

Henry died on 22 February 1296 and was buried in the monastery of the Poor Clares at Wrocław (Breslau). His sons were minors, and Henry's brother Bolko became their guardian.

Marriage and Children

Around 1273, Henry married Elisabeth (c. 1263 – 28 September 1304), daughter of Bolesław the Pious, Duke of Greater Poland. They had eight children:
Hedwig (c. 1277 – aft. 3 February 1347); married by 1289/95 to Prince Otto of Brandenburg–Salzwedel, second son of Margrave Otto V. After her husband died, she became a nun in St. Klara, Wrocław.
Euphemia (c. 1278 – June 1347); married in 1300 Otto III of Carinthia.
Anna (1284 – 2/3 October 1343); Abbess of St. Klara, Wrocław.
Elisabeth (c. 1290 – Nov 1357/58); Abbess of St. Klara, Wrocław.
Bolesław III the Generous (23 September 1291 – 21 April 1352).
Helena (c. 1293 – aft. 1300); nun in St. Klara, Gniezno.
Henry VI the Good (18 March 1294 – 24 November 1335).
Władysław (b. posthumously, 6 June 1296 – 13 January aft. 1352).

Notes

References
Menzel, Josef Joachim. Neue Deutsche Biographie (NDB). Volume 8. Duncker & Humblot, Berlin 1969, s.v. Heinrich V der Dicke, pp. 396–7 
Cawley, Charles; Foundation for Medieval Genealogy, Medieval Lands Project; Silesia v3.0; Dukes of Liegnitz (Legnica) (Piast), Dukes of Liegnitz (Legnica) 1278–1409 (Chap 7A); Heinrich von Liegnitz, retrieved August 2012.
 HENRYK V BRZUCHATY (GRUBY, TŁUSTY)
Substantial parts of this article were translated from the version on the Polish wikipedia.

|-

|-

|-

|-

|-

|-

|-

1240s births
1296 deaths
Dukes of Legnica
Dukes of Wrocław
13th-century Polish nobility
People of Byzantine descent
Year of birth uncertain